"Rhinestone Cowboy" is a 1975 Glen Campbell song. Rhinestone Cowboy may also refer to:

Arts, entertainment, and media
Albums
Rhinestone Cowboy (album), 1975 Glen Campbell album
Rhinestone Cowboy (New Studio Recordings), 2004 Glen Campbell album
Rhinestone Cowboy/Bloodline The Lambert & Potter Sessions 1975–1976, Glen Campbell album
Rhinestone Cowboy Live, on the Air & in the Studio, Glen Campbell album
The Mysterious Rhinestone Cowboy, David Allan Coe album

Songs
"Rhinestone Cowboy", the last song on Madvillain's debut album Madvillainy

Literature
Rhinestone Cowboy, the autobiography of Glen Campbell

Other uses
Rhinestone Cowboy (horse), a race horse